Christopher Farnsworth (born 1971) is an American novelist and screenwriter. He is the author of the President's Vampire series of novels from G.P. Putnam's Sons and a former journalist.

Bibliography
 Blood Oath (2010)
 The President's Vampire (2011)
 Red, White, and Blood (2012)
 The Burning Men: A Nathaniel Cade Story (2014)
 The Eternal World (2015)
 Killfile (2016)
 Flashmob (2017)
 Deep State: A Nathaniel Cade Story (2017)

References

External links
 

1971 births
Living people
American male novelists
21st-century American novelists
American male screenwriters
21st-century American screenwriters
21st-century American male writers